Niagara Peak is a high mountain summit in the San Juan Mountains range of the Rocky Mountains System, in southwestern Colorado.  

See also
List of Colorado mountain summits
List of the most prominent summits of Colorado
List of Colorado county high points

References

External links

San Juan Mountains (Colorado)
Mountains of Hinsdale County, Colorado
Mountains of San Juan County, Colorado
North American 4000 m summits
Great Divide of North America
Mountains of Colorado